J. Nelson Brown  was an American curler. He played third on the Detroit Curling Club team (from Detroit, Michigan, United States) during the World Curling Championships known as the 1963 Scotch Cup, where United States team finished with bronze medals.

In 1990 he was inducted to United States Curling Hall of Fame.

References 

Year of birth missing (living people)
Living people
American male curlers
American curling champions